The National Women's Cricket Championship, officially the Mohtarma Fatima Jinnah National Women's Cricket Championship, was a women's domestic one-day cricket competition that took place in Pakistan between 2004–05 and 2017. The tournament included both regional and departmental teams, and took place alongside the Women's Cricket Challenge Trophy.

Zarai Taraqiati Bank Limited were the most successful side in the history of the competition, with 7 titles. Karachi and Lahore are the only other sides to have won the competition, with 4 and 2 titles, respectively.

History
The National Women's Cricket Championship began in the 2004–05 season, with eight regional teams competing in Lahore across a week in March 2005. The tournament followed the creation of a women's wing of the Pakistan Cricket Board a year previously, and was hoped to spark greater interest in cricket amongst women. The competition was won by Karachi, who beat Lahore in the final by 6 wickets.

The tournament soon expanded, with Sialkot joining the following season and Abbottabad and Pakistan Universities the season after. Karachi and Lahore dominated the first four seasons of the competition, reaching the final every time, with Karachi winning three tournaments and Lahore one.

From the 2009–10 season, new team Zarai Taraqiati Bank Limited dominated the tournament, winning seven titles, one in every season they competed. In 2014, the only season in this period in which Zarai did not compete, Lahore claimed their second title, beating Karachi in the final. That year, the tournament was also renamed the Mohtarma Fatima Jinnah National Women's Cricket Championship, after the Pakistani politician.

In the final season of the tournament, 2017, the teams were split into two sections, one for regional teams and one for departmental teams, meaning there were two winners: Karachi won the Super League to win the regional section, whilst Zarai Taraqiati Bank Limited beat the Higher Education Commission in the final of the departmental round. In 2017–18, the tournament was replaced by the PCB Triangular One Day Women's Tournament, with composite rather than geographical or departmental teams.

Matches in the tournament were predominantly played using a limited overs format with 50 overs per side, apart from in the first two seasons, where matches could also be either 30, 35 or 40 overs per side. The tournament had various formats over the years, but generally involved teams divided into an initial group stage, with the top performing teams progressing to a secondary group stage before the winners of these groups progressed to the final.

Teams

Key
  Champions 
  Runners-up 
  Competed 
  Did not compete

Results

See also
 Pakistan Women's One Day Cup

References

Pakistani domestic cricket competitions
Women's cricket competitions in Pakistan
Recurring sporting events established in 2005
2005 establishments in Pakistan
Limited overs cricket